KVSA (1220 AM) was an American radio station licensed to serve McGehee, Arkansas, United States. The station,  was last owned by Southeast Arkansas Broadcasters, Inc.

History
KVSA was founded in 1953 by Abbott F. Kinney. The station broadcast an adult standards/middle of the road music format to southeastern Arkansas.

As of 1 p.m., March 3, 2020, KVSA signed off the air for the last time, and made a Facebook post on its page reporting that fact.  The station surrendered its license to the FCC on March 5, 2020, and the FCC cancelled the license on March 12, 2020.

References

External links
KVSA historic profile video (youtube.com, circa 2010)
FCC Station Search Details: DKVSA (Facility ID: 61187)
FCC History Cards for KVSA (covering 1951-1979)

VSA
Adult standards radio stations in the United States
Radio stations established in 1953
Radio stations disestablished in 2020
Desha County, Arkansas
1953 establishments in Arkansas
2020 disestablishments in Arkansas
Defunct radio stations in the United States
VSA